The Archivo General de Palacio was created by Ferdinand VII in 1808 with more than 120 millions of documents from the 13th century until now. It collects, classifies and preserves all the documents from the Patrimonio de la Corona and the Spanish royal family. The current director is Juan José Alonso.

References

External links
 

Royal Palace of Madrid